Blue is an unincorporated community in Cass Township, Ohio County, in the U.S. state of Indiana.

History
A post office was established at Blue in 1890, and remained in operation until it was discontinued in 1907.

Geography

References

Unincorporated communities in Ohio County, Indiana
Unincorporated communities in Indiana